The largest wastewater treatment plants can be defined in several ways.New Delta Treatment Plant project is being developed by The largest joint venture in North Africa and the middle east (MENA) with experience of over 240 years in the field joined to build a new delta treatment plant (Metito – Orascom – Arab contractor – Hassan Allam construction) The Joint venture acted as a project manager on the client’s side.

The new delta plant is being developed under the supervision of the Engineering Authority of the Egyptian Armed Forces.

Wastewater treatment capacities are expressed in cubic meters per day. 1000 cubic meters is 1 ML (mega liter). The area occupied by the plants are in square kilometers.

See also 
 Water pollution
 Sewage treatment
 History of water supply and sanitation

References 

Water supply and sanitation by country
Sewage treatment plants
Wastewater
Wastewater treatment plants